Liss Platt (born 1965) is a Canadian artist who works in a variety of media, including video, film and installation. Her work is included in the collections of the Whitney Museum of American Art and the RISD Museum.

References

1965 births
Living people
Canadian video artists
Canadian installation artists
Women video artists
Women installation artists
20th-century Canadian artists
20th-century Canadian women artists
21st-century Canadian artists
21st-century Canadian women artists